Robinsons Townville Cabanatuan (referenced as Robinsons Cabanatuan listed on the text-only annual reports for Robinsons Land (known as SEC 17-A) is a shopping mall located Maharlika Highway, Cabanatuan, Philippines. The mall is owned by John Gokongwei, founder of JG Summit Holdings and Robinsons Land Co, it is the first Robinsons mall in the province. The mall was built beside NE Pacific Mall in 2007. The mall had its soft opening in November 2008 and its grand opening the next year.

Although the mall was owned by Robinsons Land Corporation (the parent of Robinsons Malls), it was operated by Robinsons Retail Holdings, Inc. (whose parent company of several in-house retail stores for each Robinsons Malls such as Robinsons Supermarket, Robinsons Department Store, Robinsons Appliances, Toys-R-Us, and among others). Thus, the mall was not listed on Robinsons Malls' website (as well as its own mobile app for handheld devices) though yet determined is still part of Robinsons Land's chain of malls (referenced on both companies' text-only annual reports and mall chain-wide promos). The mall was rebranded as Robinsons Townville Cabanatuan, referring the RRHI's (the mall's operator) own community mall-formatted that it was sister counterpart of Robinsons Malls.

Features 
Robinsons Townville Cabanatuan is one of the most visited malls in the city. The mall is a 3-storey building which is mainly occupied by the Robinsons Department Store on the 2nd and 3rd floors, Robinsons Appliances and Handyman Do-It Best Hardware is located on the 2nd floor while Robinsons Supermarket is located in the 1st floor.  The mall attracts a daily foot traffic of over 100,000 people, which increases every weekends.  The mall shared profits with the much larger NE Pacific Mall, which is a property of the NE Group of Companies and Landco Pacific Corporation.

See also
SM City Cabanatuan
SM Megacenter Cabanatuan
NE Pacific Mall

References

Shopping malls established in 2009
Shopping malls in Nueva Ecija
Buildings and structures in Cabanatuan
Robinsons Malls